Stemmatophora vulpecalis is a species of snout moth. It is found in Spain and Algeria.

The wingspan is about 20 mm.

References

Moths described in 1891
Pyralini
Moths of Europe
Moths of Africa